Grans is a commune in the Bouches-du-Rhône department in the Provence-Alpes-Côte d'Azur region in Southern France. In 2017, it had a population of 5,118.

Population

See also
Communes of the Bouches-du-Rhône department

References

Communes of Bouches-du-Rhône
Bouches-du-Rhône communes articles needing translation from French Wikipedia